The Royal Geographical Society (with the Institute of British Geographers), often shortened to RGS, is a learned society and professional body for geography based in the United Kingdom. Founded in 1830 for the advancement of geographical sciences, the Society has 16,000 members, with its work reaching the public through publications, research groups and lectures.

The Society was founded in 1830 under the name Geographical Society of London as an institution to promote the 'advancement of geographical science'. It later absorbed the older African Association, which had been founded by Sir Joseph Banks in 1788, as well as the Raleigh Club and the Palestine Association.  In 1995 it merged with the Institute of British Geographers, a body for academic geographers, to become officially the Royal Geographical Society with IBG.

The society is governed by its Council, which is chaired by the Society's President, according to a set of statutes and standing orders. The members of Council and the President are elected from and by its Fellows, who are allowed to use the postnominal title FRGS. As a Chartered body, the RGS holds the register of Chartered Geographers in the public interest, a source of qualified, practising and experienced professional geographers. Fellows may apply for chartership if they fulfil the required criteria.

History

The Society was founded in 1830 under the name Geographical Society of London as an institution to promote the 'advancement of geographical science'. It later absorbed the older African Association, which had been founded by Sir Joseph Banks in 1788, as well as the Raleigh Club and the Palestine Association.

Like many learned societies, it had started as a dining club in London, where select members held informal dinner debates on current scientific issues and ideas.

Founding members of the Society include Sir John Barrow, Sir John Franklin and Sir Francis Beaufort. Under the patronage of King William IV it later became known as The Royal Geographical Society (RGS) and was granted its Royal Charter under Queen Victoria in 1859.

From 1830 to 1840 the RGS met in the rooms of the Horticultural Society in Regent Street, London and from 1854 -1870 at 15 Whitehall Place, London. In 1870, the Society finally found a home when it moved to 1 Savile Row, London – an address that quickly became associated with adventure and travel.

The Society also used a lecture theatre in Burlington Gardens, London which was lent to it by the Civil Service Commission. However, the arrangements were thought to be rather cramped and squalid.

A new impetus was given to the Society's affairs in 1911, with the election of Earl Curzon, the former Viceroy of India, as the Society's President (1911–1914). The premises in Savile Row were sold and the present site, Lowther Lodge in Kensington Gore, was purchased for £100,000 and opened for use in April 1913. In the same year the Society's ban on women was lifted.

Lowther Lodge was built in 1874 for the William Lowther by Norman Shaw, one of the most outstanding domestic architects of his day. Extensions to the east wing were added in 1929, and included the New Map Room and the 750 seat Lecture Theatre. The extension was formally opened by the Duke of York (later King George VI) at the Centenary Celebrations on 21 October 1930.

The history of the Society was closely allied for many of its earlier years with 'colonial' exploration in Africa, the Indian subcontinent, the polar regions, and central Asia especially.

It has been a key associate and supporter of many notable explorers and expeditions, including those of Darwin, Livingstone, Stanley, Scott, Shackleton, Hunt and Hillary.

The early history of the Society is inter-linked with the history of British Geography, exploration and
discovery. Information, maps, charts and knowledge gathered on expeditions was sent to the RGS, making up its now unique geographical collections. The Society published its first journal in 1831 and from 1855, accounts of meetings and other matters were published in the Society Proceedings. In 1893, this was replaced by The Geographical Journal which is still published today.

The Society was also pivotal in establishing Geography as a teaching and research discipline in British universities, and funded the first Geography positions in the Universities of Oxford and Cambridge.

With the advent of a more systematic study of geography, the Institute of British Geographers (IBG) was formed in 1933, by thirteen geographers including Hilda Ormsby, Andrew Charles O'Dell, as the RGS was seen as too focused on exploration. Its activities included organising conferences, field trips, seminars and specialist research groups and publishing the journal, Transactions of the Institute of British Geographers. The RGS and IBG co-existed for 60 years until 1992 when a merger was discussed. In 1994, members were balloted and the merger agreed. In January 1995, the new Royal Geographical Society (with the Institute of British Geographers) was formed.

The Society also works together with other existing bodies serving the geographical community, in particular the Geographical Association and the Royal Scottish Geographical Society.

In 2004, The Society's historical Collections relating to scientific exploration and research, which are of national and international importance, were opened to the public for the first time. In the same year, a new category of membership was introduced to widen access for people with a general interest in geography. The new Foyle Reading Room and glass Pavilion exhibition space were also opened to the public in 2004 – unlocking the Society intellectually, visually and physically for the 21st century. For example, in 2012 the RGS held an exhibition, in the glass Pavilion, of photographs taken by Herbert Ponting on Captain Robert Falcon Scott's expedition to the South Pole in 1912.

Governance

Council 
The society is governed by its board of trustees called the council, which is chaired by its president. The members of council and the president are elected from its fellowship. The council consists of 36 members, 22 of which are elected by fellows and serve for a three-year term. In addition to the elected trustees, there are honorary members—who include the Duke of Kent as honorary president—who sit on the council. 

The society has five specialist committees that it derives advice from the Education Committee, Research Committee, Expedition and Fieldwork Committee, Information Resources Committee, and the Finance Committee.

Presidents

Membership
There are four categories of individual membership:

Membership
Anyone with an interest in geography is eligible to apply to become a member of the RGS-IBG.

Student Membership
Students who are studying geography (or an allied subject) at GCSE, A Level or as an undergraduate (or at equivalent levels).

Associate Fellowship
This status is available by application from postgraduate students or those within five years of graduating from their first degree.

Fellowship
Fellows of the Society come from a wide range of professional backgrounds. They must either be proposed by an existing Fellow or an individual may submit evidence of his or her own work and academic publications in the field of geography and closely related subjects such as international development, climate change and expedition medicine. Applicants must be of at least 21 years of age and provide evidence of a body of relevant work; alternatively, a previous five-year commitment at the regular Member level (less, at the council's discretion) is also considered for eligibility. Fellows may use the post-nominal designation FRGS after their names.

Chartered geographer

Since 2002 the society has been granted the power to award the status of chartered geographer. The status of can be obtained only by those who have a degree in geography or related subject and at least 6 years' geographical experience, or 15 years' geographical work experience for those without a degree. Being awarded the status allows the use of the post-nominal letters "CGeog".

Chartered geographer (teacher) is a professional accreditation available to teachers who can demonstrate competence, experience and professionalism in the use of geographical knowledge or skills in and out of the classroom, and who are committed to maintaining their professional standards through ongoing continuing professional development (CPD).

Research groups
The Society's Research and Study Groups bring together active researchers and professional geographers in particular areas of geography. There are 27 active research groups, with each group organising their own seminars, conferences, workshops and other activities.

Medals and awards
The society also presents awards to geographers that have contributed to the advancement of geography.

The most prestigious of these awards are the Founder's Medal and the Patron's Medal. The award is given for "the encouragement and promotion of geographical science and discovery", and are approved by King Charles III. The awards originated as an annual gift of fifty guineas from King William IV, first made in 1831, "to constitute a premium for the encouragement and promotion of geographical science and discovery". The Society decided in 1839 to change this monetary award into two gold medals: Founder’s Medal and the Patron’s. The award has been given to notable geographers including David Livingstone (1855), Nain Singh Rawat (1876), Baron Ferdinand von Richthofen (1878), Alfred Russel Wallace (1892), and Frederick Courtney Selous (1893) to more recent winners including Percy Harrison Fawcett (1916), Professor William Morris Davis (1919), Sir Halford John Mackinder (1945), Professor L. Dudley Stamp (1949), Professor Richard Chorley (1987) and Professor David Harvey (1995). In 2004 Harish Kapadia was awarded the Patron's Medal for contributions to geographical discovery and mountaineering in the Himalayas, making him the second Indian to receive the award in its history. In 2005 the Founder's Medal was awarded to Professor Sir Nicholas Shackleton for his research in the field of Quaternary Palaeoclimatology and the Patron's Medal was awarded to Professor Jean Malaurie for a lifelong study of the Arctic and its people. In 1902 they awarded khan Bahadur Sher Jang a Sword of Honour (the Black Memorial) in recognition of his valuable services to geography

In total the society awards 17 medals and awards including Honorary Membership and Fellowships. Some of the other awards given by the Society include:
 The Victoria Medal (1902) for "conspicuous merit in research in Geography"
 The Murchison Award (1882) for the "publication judged to contribute most to geographical science in preceding recent years"
 The Back Award (1882) for "applied or scientific geographical studies which make an outstanding contribution to the development of national or international public policy"
 The Busk Medal (1975) for "conservation research or for fieldwork abroad in Geography or in a geographical aspect of an allied science" 
 The Cuthbert Peek Award (1883) for "those advancing geographical knowledge of human impact on the environment through the application of contemporary methods, including those of earth observation and mapping"
 The Edward Heath Award (1984) for "geographical research in either Europe or the developing world"
 The Cherry Kearton Medal and Award for "a traveller concerned with the study or practice of natural history, with a preference for those with an interest in nature photography, art or cinematography".
 The Ness Award for "travellers, particularly those who have successfully popularised Geography and the wider understanding of our world and its environments"

Collections

The Society's Collections consist of over two million documents, maps, photographs, paintings, periodicals, artefacts and books, and span 500 years of geography, travel and exploration. The Society preserves the Collections for the benefit of future generations, while providing public access and promoting Collections-related educational programmes for schools and lifelong learners. The Foyle Reading Room acts as a consultation space for using the Society's collections, and hosts showcases and workshops as well as the Be Inspired series of talks.

Artefacts
The artefacts collection includes over a thousand items brought to the Society, consisting mainly of cultural objects from around the world, ranging from Inuit boots (from Canadian Arctic) to ceremonial leopard's claws (from the then Belgian Congo), paraphernalia of exploration, for example oxygen sets used in the various attempts on Everest, and personal items belonging to explorers, such as Shackleton's Burberry helmet. Artefacts from the collection have been loaned to exhibitions around the world and are in continual demand.

Books and journals
The library collection holds over 150,000 bound volumes which date primarily from the foundation of the Society in 1830 onwards, and focus on the history and geography of places worldwide. Example volumes include information on European migration, a 19th-century guidebook to Berlin, and David Livingstone's account of his search for the source of the Nile. It currently receives around 800 journal titles, as well as many more journal titles that are either not currently subscribed to, or have ceased publication, allowing Society members access to the latest geographical academic literature in addition to the journals published by the RGS-IBG itself.

Expedition report
The RGS-IBG houses a collection of 4,500 expedition reports. These documents contain details of the achievements and research results of expeditions to almost every country of the world. The catalogue of these reports, and over 8,500 planned and past expeditions, is held on a database which provides contact with a wide variety of sporting, scientific and youth expeditions from 1965 to the present day.

Maps and atlases
The Society holds one of the largest private map collections in the world which is continuously increasing. It includes one million sheets of maps and charts, 3000 atlases, 40 globes and 1000 gazetteers. The earliest printed item in the Collection dates back to 1482. The RGS-IBG also holds manuscript materials from the mid sixteenth century onwards, aerial photography from 1919 and contemporary satellite images.

Manuscript archive
The Manuscript archive collection consists of material arising out of the conduct of Society business and manuscripts relating to persons or subjects of special interest. The document collection includes a few papers from before the Society's foundation in 1830, and is particularly useful to biographers of nineteenth and early twentieth century travellers and geographers, as well as research into the development of geographical knowledge and the historical development of geography.

Events recordings
Since 1994, the Society has recorded the majority of its Monday night lectures – Society members and Fellows can watch selected lectures from 2006 onwards online.

Photographs and artworks
The Society's Picture Library holds over half a million photographs, artworks, negatives, lantern slides and albums dating from around 1830. Historic images range from the Antarctic adventures of Scott and Shackleton to the pioneering journeys of Livingstone, Baker, Speke and Burton.

Grants
An important way in which the RGS-IBG develops new knowledge and advances geographical science is by providing funding for geographical research and scientific expeditions. The Society offers a number of grants to researchers, students, teachers and independent travellers. More than 70 projects are supported each year and in excess of £180,000 is awarded annually. Research has been conducted in more than 120 countries, from Namibia to Brazil to Greenland.

Expeditions, fieldwork and independent travel grants
Every year the RGS-IBG helps teams of students and researchers to get into the field with Geographical Fieldwork Grants, the Society's longest running grant scheme. The newest initiative is the RGS-IBG International Field Centre Grants, for work in international field centres in developing nations. Independent travel grants support geographical expeditions.

Student grants
Each year, the Society supports over 50 student fieldwork projects, from PhD students collecting data for their dissertation to groups of undergraduates looking to get out into the field for the first time. Grants are available for both human and physical geography projects, in any area of the world.

Research grants
The Society supports a range of field and desk-based research by academic geographers, from established researchers undertaking fieldwork to early career academics working on smaller projects. The RGS-IBG also supports academics attending geographical conferences around the world. Some awards focus on particular geographical regions or topics, with others open to any aspect of the discipline.

Teaching grants
The Society supports innovation in teaching geography at secondary and higher education level, offering several awards for school teachers to work alongside researchers in geographical research, so to develop educational resources for the classroom, and to create teaching materials.

Public engagement

21st Century Challenges
21st Century Challenges is the Society's discussion series that aims to improve public understanding of, and engagement with, some of the big issues likely to affect our lives and society in the coming years. The talks are held at the Society's headquarters in South Kensington, London, with all talks available to watch online along with additional information.

Discovering Britain 
Discovering Britain is a website featuring a series of self-led geographical walks that help explain the stories behind the UK's built and natural landscapes. Each walk explores a particular landscape, finding out about the way in which the forces of nature, people, events and the economy have created and shaped the area. There are now more than 120 walks on the Discovering Britain website, covering all regions of the United Kingdom. Walks are themed according to the landscape in which they are located, including built, prehistoric, historic, working, hidden and changing landscapes. Walks also look at people in the landscape, and shaping, preserving and exploiting the landscape.

Hidden Journeys
Hidden Journeys is a public engagement project of the Royal Geographical Society (with IBG) that started in 2010. The Hidden Journeys website combines images, stories and maps (many from the Society's geographical collections) into a series of interactive guides of popular flight paths, enabling people to explore the incredible places they fly over and might see from the air. Since launching, online guides have been published for more than 25 flight paths, including London to Johannesburg, New York City to Los Angeles, Sydney to Singapore, Madrid to Rio de Janeiro.

The Hidden Journeys project is also integrating its content with the moving maps aboard airliners, as a new form of in-flight entertainment (IFE) that has been termed geo-entertainment or geotainment.

In December 2013, Singapore Airlines began a trial of an enhanced moving map that featured Hidden Journeys content. Developed in partnership between Hidden Journeys and the IFE software company Airborne Interactive, the enhanced map is available for the Singapore-London route on the airline's brand new Boeing 777-300ER (flight number SQ308 and SQ319), and features a range of geographical facts and highlights, photography and maps, all curated by the Royal Geographical Society (with IBG). Information is delivered in real time, with content changing as the flight progresses, so for example, while a passenger is passing over the United Kingdom, they'll be met with a pop-up that explains the origins and importance of the English Channel.

Schools
The RGS-IBG education department offers courses, resources, accreditation, grants, awards, competitions and school membership, all for the benefit of teachers, students and parents. It also runs the Geography Ambassador scheme.

Educational resources
The Society produces cases studies, lesson plans and activity ideas for an all levels of learning, from KS1 up to post-GCSE. The Geography in the News website is available for Schools Members and Young Geographers. It has more than 300 topical case studies. Many of the Society's other resources are free to use.

Geography Ambassadors
The Geography Ambassadors scheme recruits, trains and supports volunteer undergraduate, postgraduate and graduate geographers from universities and business. Geography Ambassadors deliver lively, activity-based sessions at schools and they engage with more than 30,000 pupils each year. The scheme is aimed at introducing students to the benefits of studying geography beyond a compulsory level in schools, but also into higher education and employment.

Competitions 
The Society also has competitions for students studying geography. The Young Geographer of the Year has four categories for students in KS2 through to A-Level. All students have to produce posters on a given topic, except the A-Level students who are expected to write an essay. For A-Level students there is also the David W. Smith Memorial Award, an annual essay competition, and the Ron Cooke Award for the best A-Level coursework.

Publications

Journals
The Royal Geographical Society (with IBG)'s scholarly publications provide an outlet and support for the dissemination of research across the breadth of the discipline. In 2012, three main journals alone were accessed online internationally over 1.3 million times.

 Area: has an annual prize for new researchers.
 GEO: Geography and Environment: an open access journal launched in 2014.
 The Geographical Journal (GJ): focusing on public debates, policy-oriented agendas and notions of 'relevance' the long-running GJ has international reach.
 Transactions of the Institute of British Geographers: one of the international journals of geographical research.
 WIREs: Climate Change: developed in association with the Royal Meteorological Society and Wiley-Blackwell, this review journal provides an important new encyclopaedic reference for climate change scholarship and research.

Magazine
Geographical is the official monthly magazine of the Society, and has been published continuously since 1935. The magazine contains illustrated articles on people, places, adventure, travel, and environmental issues, as well as summarising the latest academic research and discoveries in geography. Geographical also reports news of the Society's latest work and activities to members and the public.

See also

 Concepts and Techniques in Modern Geography
 Gamma Theta Upsilon
 Hakluyt Society
History of science
List of British professional bodies
List of Royal Societies
Royal Institution
Royal Scottish Geographical Society

References

Further reading
Mill, H. R. (1930) The record of the Royal Geographical Society, 1830–1930, London : Royal Geographical Society, p. 288.
Royal Geographical Society (2005) To the ends of the Earth : visions of a changing world : 175 years of exploration and photography, London : Bloomsbury, .
Winser, S. (Ed.) (2004) Royal Geographical Society with the Institute of British Geographers expedition handbook, New ed., London : Profile, .

External links

Royal Geographical Society (with IBG) : the heart of geography
Royal Geographical Society Picture Library – Images of travel & exploration

 
Fellows of the Royal Geographical Society
1830 establishments in the United Kingdom
Geography of the United Kingdom
Geographic societies
Learned societies of the United Kingdom
Organizations established in 1830
Organisations based in the United Kingdom with royal patronage
South Kensington